Bethel United Methodist Church is located at 4843 South US Hwy. 441 at County Road 133-B in Lake City, Florida. Known as Old Bethel Church, it was first organized by Alligator area settlers as early as the 1820s. The original church was a small log structure located about two miles northeast of its current location. In 1855, the new building was erected to accommodate a growing number of parishioners. It is one of only a few Antebellum church buildings which have survived in rural Florida. Bethel Church has served its congregation continuously since its mid-nineteenth century founding. The building has been known in the community as "the white church by the side of the road" for over one hundred years. There is also a Bethel UMC in Warrenton, Virginia.

Gallery

References

External links
 Bethel UMC, Lake City, FL
 Flickr photo and text

United Methodist churches in Florida
Churches in Columbia County, Florida
Lake City, Florida
1820s establishments in Florida Territory